Humphrey Patrick Guinness (March 24, 1902 – February 10, 1986) was a British polo player who competed in the 1936 Summer Olympics.

Biography
He was born on 24 March 1902, and was educated at Eton College and the Royal Military College, Sandhurst. His father Lt-Col Eustace Guinness DSO died at Bakenlaagte in the Second Boer War. His mother was Isabel, daughter of Charles Bell, J.P., of Woolsington Hall, Northumberland, England. His great-grandfather Robert Rundell Guinness (1789-1857) founded the Guinness Mahon bank in 1836.

He participated in the 1930 and 1936 International Polo Cup. He became part of the British polo team, which won the silver medal in 1936. He played both matches in the tournament, the first against Mexico and the final against Argentina.

During World War II  he served as a colonel in the Royal Scots Greys. In 1946 he married Gladys, daughter of Major William Edward Gatacre. He died in 1986.

References

External links
profile

1902 births
1986 deaths
People educated at Eton College
Graduates of the Royal Military College, Sandhurst
English polo players
Olympic polo players of Great Britain
Polo players at the 1936 Summer Olympics
Olympic silver medallists for Great Britain
Roehampton Trophy
International Polo Cup
Medalists at the 1936 Summer Olympics
Olympic medalists in polo
Humphrey Patrick